The Concerned Citizens' Movement (CCM) is a Nevis-based political party in Saint Kitts and Nevis. Led by Mark Brantley, it is currently the largest party in Nevis, holding all three seats Nevisian seats in the National Assembly and three out of five seats in the Nevis Island Assembly. The CCM operates only in Nevis and for the 2022 general election is in a One Movement alliance with the People's Action Movement (PAM) operating in Saint Kitts, following the breakdown of the governing Team Unity alliance.

History
The party was established in 1987 and first contested national elections in 1989, when they received 6.4% of the vote and won a single seat. In the 1993 elections their vote share rose to 10.9% and they won two seats. Although their vote share fell to 7.0% in 1995 they retained both seats. The party retained both seats in elections in 2000, 2004 and 2010.
On October 30, 2017, Premier of Nevis Vance Amory handed over party leadership to Mark Brantley. An unprecedented move with this becoming the first time in St Kitts-Nevis politics, that an elected representative has passed on the leadership of a party without being unseated.

In the December 2017 Nevis Island election, Mark Brantley remained Premier after leading the CCM to victory, winning 4 out of 5 available seats (an increase of one).

Among their current executive members is Alexis Jeffers.

Leadership 
Vance Amory led the party from 1987 to 2017, and was followed by Mark Brantley.

Election results

References

External links
Official website
Defunct website

Political parties in Saint Kitts and Nevis
Separatism in Saint Kitts and Nevis
Political parties established in 1987
Nevis
1987 establishments in Saint Kitts and Nevis
Conservative parties
Republican parties
Republicanism in Saint Kitts and Nevis
Anti-communist parties